Spike was an Australian pay television channel owned by ViacomCBS Networks UK & Australia. It launched on 1 July 2016 on Fetch TV and was exclusive to that service. A localised version of the U.S. channel of the same name, it primarily aired entertainment programming geared towards a male audience, including import dramas, programming from its former U.S. counterpart, and mixed martial arts.

The channel was closed on 27 February 2022 with no replacement; most of its programming had already transitioned to the domestic version of Paramount+ in the months prior.

References

External links

Television networks in Australia
English-language television stations in Australia
Television channels and stations established in 2016
2016 establishments in Australia
Spike (TV network)
Television channels and stations disestablished in 2022
2022 disestablishments in Australia